Bun is a Yuat language of Papua New Guinea. It is spoken in Biwat village of Yuat Rural LLG, East Sepik Province.

References

Yuat languages
Languages of East Sepik Province